Eulavinia is a monotypic moth genus in the family Notodontidae. Its only species, Eulavinia  lavinia, is found in Kenya. The species was first described by James Farish Malcolm Fawcett in 1916.

References 

 

Endemic moths of Kenya
Notodontidae
Moths of Africa
Moths described in 1916
Monotypic moth genera